Avian Limited is a British aircraft manufacturer that produces a line of recreational and competition hang gliders. The company also markets recreational aviation products from other companies, including rigid wing hang gliders from A-I-R Atos.

Avian was founded in 1989 by Steve Elkins and Neil Hammerton. Avian acquired the  manufacturing rights to the Aerial Arts Clubman hang glider and started by producing this design. This was quickly developed into the Avian Elan which remained in production for 10 years when it was replaced by the Avian Rio, later developed into the Rio2.

Steve Elkins continued as owner and Director of Avian until 2017 when it was bought by Tim Swait who also replaced him as Director.

Aircraft

References

External links

Aircraft manufacturers of England
Hang gliders
1989 establishments in England
British companies established in 1989
Companies based in Derbyshire